Chori Chori (English: Stealthily) is a 1956 Indian Hindi-language romantic comedy film directed by Anant Thakur. It stars Raj Kapoor, Nargis in lead roles. Pran, Johnny Walker, Gope, David, Bhagwan Dada have character parts. It is an adaptation of the 1934 American film It Happened One Night. This was the last film of Nargis and Kapoor together as leads, with Nargis doing one cameo appearance in the Kapoor starrer Jagte Raho (1956). 

Music was composed by Shankar-Jaikishan and lyrics were written by Hasrat Jaipuri and Shailendra. The music of Chori Chori had popular tracks including "Aaja Sanam", "Yeh Raat Bheegi Bheegi", "Jahan Mein Jati Hoon" in the voices of Lata Mangeshkar and Manna Dey and "Sawa Lakh Ki Lottery," by Lata Mangeshkar and Mohammad Rafi. Sequences for songs "Panchhi Banoon Udti Phiroon" and "Jahan Main Jaati Hoon" were shot and released in Technicolor. This was known to be AVM Productions's first film to contain sequences in colour. The film was later entirely remastered and recolourised.

Plot

Kammo (Nargis) lives a wealthy lifestyle with her widowed multi-millionaire dad, Girhdari Lal (Gope). He would like her to marry someone who is not after their wealth. To his dismay, she chooses to marry a pilot named Sumankumar (Pran), who is known for womanizing and greed. When he disapproves, she runs away from home. The news of her running is announced on radio and newspaper offering a reward of 1.25 lakhs for her safe return. On the run, she decides to go by bus to meet Suman. A free-lance reporter Sagar (Raj Kapoor) in search of a story is also going to Bangalore to get advance from his editor. An auto owner cum driver Bhagwan sees the news of reward and goes with his wife to find Kammo. The first encounter of Kammo and Sagar in the bus starts with a tiff. After night's journey full of tiffs the bus stops for passengers to eat snacks. Kammo wanders off and Sagar sees the news of her running and thinks that it will be good story. She misses the bus and Sagar also let it go for his scoop. They catch the next bus, in the bus a poet (Johnny Walker) bores her by reciting his poems at that point Sagar comes to her rescue claiming to be her husband. Midway through the journey the bus breaks down and they take a room in Banwari's (David) inn where only married couples are allowed. They share room and make a partition of bed sheet. The comic situation brings them closer. Kammo spends all the money to buy toiletries, etc. They start walking the next 7 km to Bangalore. Kammo falls in love with the simple life of villages. They spent night in the open where Bhagwan spots them. In the confusion of the melee they escape with auto and take a room in Madarilal's (Mukri) inn with promise to clear rent on check out. The adventure of journey and facing situations together bonds them and they fall in love with each other. Deciding to marry Kammo, Sagar goes to Bangalore to get advance from his editor, leaving a note, while Kammo is still sleeping. The editor gives him cheque which takes time to cash. Meanwhile in the morning the Madarilal's wife humiliates Kammo and throws her out as she does not have money to pay. Kammo thinks that Sagar has abandoned her for story. She phones her father from a house and asks him to come and take her home. Coming back Sagar sees her motorcade going. He thinks she has left her. Both feel let down and dejected. He buys the auto from Bhagwan from advance money. 

Kammo has come of age and misses Sagar. Seeing her sad Girdhari Lal fixes her marriage with Suman. The news of marriage is flashed in papers. On the day of marriage a press conference is held to click the picture of bride and for QA. At the end of the conference when all are gone Sagar demands money, assuming he wants reward money the father gives him cheque of 1.25 lakhs. Sagar tears off the cheque and submits a bill for 15 rupees 12 annas for the expenses incurred during their journey. Misunderstanding over she again runs away with Sagar on the same auto but this time with the consent of her father to live happily ever after.

Cast
 Raj Kapoor as Sagar
 Nargis as Kammo
 Pran as Suman Kumar
 Johnny Walker as Shayar
 Gope as Girdharilal
 David as Banwarilal
 Mukri as Madarilal 
 Bhagwan Dada as Bhagwan
 Rajasulochana as Bhagwan's Wife
 Indira Bansal as Shayar's Wife
 Ameer Banoo as Madarilal's Wife 
 Maruti as Postal Employee
 Raj Mehra as Editor
 Neelam as Girdharilal's Secretary
 K. V. Shanthi as Dancer
 Kumari Kamala as Dancer
 Sayee & Subbalakshmi as Dancers

Awards
 Filmfare Award for Best Music Director - Shankar Jaikishan

Soundtrack
The music of this movie was composed by Shankar-Jaikishan and won them Filmfare Award for Best Music Director.

References

External links
 
 Chori Chori at the British Board of Film Classification

1956 films
1950s Hindi-language films
Films scored by Shankar–Jaikishan
Indian romantic comedy films
Indian remakes of American films
1950s romance films
Hindi-language romance films
Indian black-and-white films
1956 romantic comedy films